Tic-Tac-Dough is an American television game show based on the paper-and-pencil game of tic-tac-toe. Contestants answer questions in various categories to put up their respective symbol, X or O, on the board. Three versions were produced: the initial 1956–59 run on NBC, a 1978–86 run initially on CBS and then in syndication, and a syndicated run in 1990. The show was produced by Barry & Enright Productions.

Jack Barry, the co-producer, was the original host of the 1950s version, followed by Gene Rayburn and then Bill Wendell, with Jay Jackson and Win Elliot hosting prime time adaptations as well. Wink Martindale hosted the network and syndicated version beginning in 1978, but left the program to host and co-produce Headline Chasers and was replaced by Jim Caldwell who hosted during the 1985–86 season. Patrick Wayne hosted the 1990 version.

Gameplay
The goal of the game was to complete a line of three X or O markers on a standard tic-tac-toe board (with the reigning champion always using X's and going first). Each of the nine spaces on the gameboard featured a category. Contestants alternated choosing a category and answering a general interest or trivia question in that category. If they were correct, they earned an X or O in that square; otherwise, it remained unclaimed. The center square, being of the most strategic importance, involved a two-part question, with the contestant given 10 seconds to think of the two answers needed to win the square (though in the 1950s version, the contestant could opt out of the extra time). After each question, the categories shuffled into different positions (in the 1950s series and early in the 1978 revival, the categories shuffled only after both contestants had taken a turn). In the 1990 series, the categories shuffled prior to the start of each contestant's turn and the shuffle was stopped when the contestant in control hit his/her lock-in button. If it became impossible for either contestant to form a winning line, whether or not all nine spaces had been claimed, the game was declared a draw and a new one began. The process continued until the deadlock was broken, however long it took to do so. This meant that a match could take multiple episodes to complete, which happened quite often. Tic-Tac-Dough used a rollover format, which allowed a new game or match to start at any point during an episode, continue until time was called, and then resume on the next episode with the same categories in play.

The gameboard on the original 1950s series used rolling drums (each containing the same nine categories) to display subject categories, with light displays beneath them to indicate X's and O's. When Tic-Tac-Dough was revived in 1978, the gameboard was made up of nine Apple II systems connected to individual computer monitors to represent each game screen, all linked to a central Altair 8800 computer, which displayed the categories, X's and O's, bonus game numbers and amounts, and dragon, in addition to a moving screensaver and custom messages. It was the first game show to use computerized graphics. The 1990 series used a completely computer-generated setup for its gameboard.

On the original 1950s Tic-Tac-Dough, a winning contestant played until either he/she was defeated or elected to stop. The second option was a Barry & Enright staple that had been used on Twenty One, which made it important for a contestant to consider as if he/she chose to play another game and lost. The new champion's initial winnings would be deducted from the outgoing champion's final total. On the 1978 CBS daytime series, contestants played until either being defeated or reaching the network's $25,000 total winnings limit. The syndicated series allowed contestants to play until defeated, and for every five matches that they won, champions were rewarded with a new automobile. For most of the series there was no restrictions on winnings, with the only exception being during the show’s 1982-83 and 1983-84 seasons (see below).

Adding money to the pot
As questions were answered correctly, money was added to the pot which went to the winner:

On the original series, the same nine categories were used for an entire match regardless of the number of games played and/or episodes it took. On all subsequent series, each new game featured a different set of nine categories. If there were ties on the original or first syndicated series, the pot was carried over to each subsequent game until someone won. In the 1990 series, there was no carryover of the pot from a tied game. Instead, the values of the outer boxes increased by $500 and the center box by $1,000 until the tie was broken.

For each tie game before being defeated, losing challengers received $100 on the 1950s version and $250 from 1979 to 1986. Champions who eventually lost the match after a tie game did not receive any additional money.

1978 CBS differences
The CBS summer season featured gameplay differences. Categories were shuffled at the beginning of the game and then only prior to the champion (playing as X) choosing a category. The challenger was required to select from the remaining categories after the champion's turn. After shuffling, some categories were featured with a black background rather than blue. If a category with a black background was selected, either contestant could ring-in and respond, regardless of who selected the category.

Unlike in the 1950s series and the following syndicated series, tie games did not result in the pot carrying over or a new set of categories being played. Instead, a final jump-in question was asked and whoever answered it correctly won the game and advanced to the bonus game. The jump-in format was later used during the syndicated versions as the "Jump-In Category" (see "Special Categories" below).

Special categories
The use of special categories, which appeared in red boxes (red letters in the 1990 version), began on the syndicated version in 1980. At first, just one special category (starting in the lower right box, later in the lower center box) was used per game. Eventually, two appeared each game (one in the upper center, the other in the lower center at the start), then three of these appeared per game (in the upper center, center right and lower center boxes to start the game). The categories then shuffled like normal categories, though special categories never shuffled into the center box.

 AuctionContestants were read a question with multiple answers. Contestants took turns bidding on how many correct answers they could name until either a contestant deferred to his opponent or opted to name all the answers on the list. If the winning bidder fulfilled the bid, that contestant won the box. If not, the other contestant only needed to give one additional correct answer to win the box.
 Bonus CategoryA three-part question was asked, which, if answered correctly, gave the contestant another turn. The categories were shuffled before the extra turn; as a result, it was possible for the champion to win the game on his/her first turn by repeatedly selecting this category. If this happened, the challenger was invited back to compete in the next game.
 Challenge CategoryThe contestant who selected this category could answer the question or challenge their opponent to answer. If the controlling player gives the correct answer or the opponent gives a wrong answer, the contestant who selected the category won the box.
 Double or NothingIf the contestant answered the question correctly, they could either keep the box or try to earn a second box. If unsuccessful, the contestant lost both boxes. Later on the rule changed to where contestants no longer had the option to keep the first box and therefore were required to take the risk. When this category was selected, the board did not shuffle after the first question was answered correctly.
 Grand QuestionThis category replaced Secret Category (see below). A correct answer added $1,000 to the pot.
 It's a DilemmaThe contestant heard the question and could ask for up to five clues; however, the opponent decided who answered the question.
 Jump-In CategoryContestants used the buzzers in front of them to ring-in and answer the question. A correct answer won the box, but an incorrect answer gave the other contestant a chance to win the box by hearing the entire question. In the 1990 version, the category name was accompanied by a general subject or "Who?", "What?", "Where?", etc.
 Number PleaseThe contestants were asked a question with a numerical answer. The contestant who picked the category guessed the answer and the opponent guessed if the correct answer was higher or lower. If the opponent was correct, they won the box, otherwise the first contestant won. An exact guess of the number won the box automatically for the first contestant.
 Opponent's ChoiceThe contestant answered a question from one of two categories which were selected for them by the opponent. During the 1985–86 season, one category contained one question while the other category contained two.
 Play or PassThe contestant had the option to skip the first question and answer a second.
Secret CategoryThis was the show's first red category, which first appeared in the lower right hand corner at the start, then later appeared in the bottom center at the start. The topic of the Secret Category was only announced by the host after it was selected. A correct answer to that category doubled the value of the pot. This category was eventually replaced by Grand Question (see above).
 SeesawA question with multiple answers was read to both contestants. Contestants alternated giving correct answers until one contestant gave a wrong answer, repeated an answer, or could not think of an answer and the opponent won the box, unless the opponent could not answer either, which left the box unclaimed. The box could also be won by giving the last correct answer. 
 ShowdownContestants were asked a two-part question, using the buzzers to ring-in. The first contestant to ring-in answered one part of the question. The other contestant answered second. If one contestant was right while the other was wrong, the contestant answering correctly won the box. Otherwise, additional questions were asked until the box was awarded in this manner.
 Take TwoThe question had two clues. The contestant could answer after the first clue, but to receive the second clue he or she had to first give the opponent a chance to answer.
 Three to WinA series of buzz-in questions was asked to both contestants, with the first to answer three correctly winning the box.
 Top TenA question with ranked answers was asked. The contestant who chose the higher-ranked answer won the box; however, if the first contestant gave the top-ranked answer, he/she automatically won the box. Renamed Top This during the 1985–86 season.
 Trivia ChallengeA question with three multiple-choice answers was asked. The contestant chose to answer first or defer to their opponent. Regardless of who started, if a contestant was incorrect, his/her opponent could choose from the remaining answers. If the opponent also guessed wrong, the box remained unclaimed. Renamed Trivia Dare during the 1984–85 season.

Bonus round
The bonus round was introduced in the 1978 version, giving the winner of a match a chance to "Beat the Dragon".

CBS (Summer 1978)
On the CBS daytime summer run, the bonus round had four Xs, four Os and one dragon hidden inside the nine monitors. The Xs and Os were shuffled around so that one of the symbols formed a "Tic-Tac-Dough". For each X and O a contestant revealed, $150 was added to the pot. The contestant won the money and a prize package for finding the "Tic-Tac-Dough" line, but could quit and take the cash at any time. Finding the dragon ended the round and lost all the money in the pot. If the dragon was found, the same prize package was at stake for the entire episode until won.

Syndication (1978–86)
On the syndicated run, the squares contained the words "TIC" and "TAC", and six dollar amounts: $100, $150, $250, $300, $400, $500 (originally $50, $150, $250, $350, $400, and $500). The remaining box concealed the dragon. The object was for the contestant to accumulate $1,000 or more. If successful, the contestant won the cash and a prize package that usually consisted of furniture, trips, jewelry, and/or appliances, totaling anywhere between $2,000 and $5,000. For the first five seasons, the same prize package was at stake for the entire show until won, but this was changed to a different prize package for each bonus round for the final three seasons. The contestant automatically won by uncovering "TIC" and "TAC" (at which point the contestant also had his/her cash total augmented to $1,000). However, if the contestant found the dragon, the game ended and the contestant forfeited the prize package and the accumulated money. The contestant could stop at any time, take the money and forgo the prize package. For a brief period in 1983, a contestant had to accumulate exactly $1,000 or find TIC and TAC, but this was quickly removed.

Dragon Finder
For a time in 1983, members of the studio audience were invited to play a special "Dragon Finder" game whenever the bonus round was won or a contestant stopped early. The remaining numbers on the board were not immediately uncovered; instead, an audience member would be selected to choose which number hid the dragon. If that person did not find the dragon, another audience member would be asked to choose one of the remaining numbers. The prize for finding it was originally a flat $250, but was later increased by $50 for each incorrect guess. When the change was made to invite two audience members to take turns choosing numbers, the losing member received $50.

Syndication (1990)
The short-lived 1990 syndicated series used a bonus round that was similar to the 1978 CBS bonus round, with the champion playing for cash and a merchandise prize. There were, however, several notable differences. One was that the contestant chose between X and O as their symbol for the round and hoped to complete a "Tic-Tac-Dough" line with that symbol. In addition, an armored knight dubbed the "dragon slayer" was added to the board and finding him resulted in an automatic win. It was not always possible to complete a Tic-Tac-Dough with a contestant's chosen symbol due to both shuffling and distribution of the symbols. For example, the shuffling, which was stopped manually by the contestant, could leave contestants with no Tic-Tac-Dough possibility for their chosen symbol; sometimes a contestant might not have enough symbols on the board to complete one or the shuffle placed their symbols on the board in such a manner that they could not form any connection no matter what symbol was chosen. In these cases, the contestant could only win the prize by finding the dragon slayer.

For the first of their symbols a contestant found, they received $500. Each one found after that doubled the pot. If the contestant completed the Tic-Tac-Dough, he/she won the prize and whatever money was in the pot. Finding the dragon slayer doubled the pot, and if he was found without money in the pot, the contestant won $1,000. As before, finding the dragon at any point ended the round and cost the contestant everything.

Beginning about seven weeks into the run, the dragon and dragon slayer described their purpose in a short rap song as they were introduced by host Wayne.

Record winnings
With contestants being able to play until defeated, several Tic-Tac-Dough contestants were able to win over $100,000 on the show. Over the course of nine weeks of the show in 1980, Thom McKee defeated 43 opponents to win eight cars and take home $312,700 (with other bonus game prizes), including over $200,000 in cash, a record at the time. In one game, McKee broke the record for winning the biggest pot in a match, which reached $36,800 after four tie games against challenger Pete Cooper. McKee's winnings record stood until 1999 when Michael Shutterly won $500,000 all-cash on Who Wants to Be a Millionaire.

Although champions were not retired until defeated, a cap was placed on their overall winnings from 1982 until 1984 as noted above. This was done after CBS, by way of acquiring Tic Tac Dough for its flagship station WCBS-TV, became the program’s network-of-record; this mean that the show, as well as its Barry & Enright stablemate The Joker's Wild had been a year earlier when CBS did the same thing for that series, was subjected to network standards and practices. This included CBS’ winnings limit for any game shows airing over its airwaves, which was established at $50,000 for Tic Tac Dough; any overages were donated to a charity of the champion’s choice.

Broadcast history

NBC: 1956–59
Tic-Tac-Dough premiered on NBC daytime television on July 30, 1956, hosted by co-creator and co-executive producer Jack Barry.

Beginning on September 12, 1956, Barry began hosting Twenty-One in Primetime. The show was initially on Wednesday nights but quickly moved to Thursday nights. At this point, Gene Rayburn began hosting Tic-Tac-Dough on Fridays. Twenty One later moved to Monday nights in February, 1957, and Barry once again hosted the show all five days of the week. Barry left the show and was replaced by announcer Bill Wendell on October 6, 1958. Wendell hosted the show, with the announcing taken over by Bill McCord, until its demise on October 23, 1959.

A nighttime version, produced in color, played for bigger stakes aired from September 12, 1957, to December 29, 1958. Jay Jackson was the original host, and was replaced by Win Elliot on October 2, 1958, for the duration of the show's nighttime run. Johnny Olson filled in as both host and announcer at varying points on this version.

Quiz show scandal

In August 1958, the cross-network hit game show Dotto was canceled after network and sponsor executives discovered the game had been rigged, and when newspaper headlines exploded with confirmation that deposed Twenty One champion Herb Stempel's allegations of rigging on that show were true, the big money quiz shows began to sink in the ratings and disappear from the air as the scandal widened.

Tic-Tac-Dough did not go unscathed before its cancellation. The April 3, 1958 episode featuring U.S. military serviceman Michael O'Rourke winning over $140,000 became one key subject of the federal grand jury investigating the quiz fixing. That run occurred during Jay Jackson's tenure as host. Jackson was never implicated in any wrongdoing himself, and he had left the show well before the quiz investigations began, but he never again hosted a television game show. The same could not be said for Tic-Tac-Dough producer Howard Felsher. Felsher was in charge of all facets of the show's production, including selecting contestants. One of them, sixteen-year-old Kirsten Falke, auditioned as a folk singer. This led her to the offices of Tic-Tac-Dough producer Felsher, who provided Kirsten with the answers and hints to win on the show and a promise to showcase her talent and sing. "I botched it up", said Kirsten. She requested her categories in the wrong order and, as a result, walked away with a paltry $800. A grand jury subpoenaed Kirsten to testify, and Felsher implored her to lie. Felsher admitted to Congress that he urged roughly 30 former show contestants and all of his production staff to lie to the grand jury, and that he had himself lied under oath. Felsher also estimated that about 75% of the nighttime Tic-Tac-Dough run had been rigged. Felsher was fired in the fallout of the quiz show scandals by NBC, but later resurfaced as a producer for Goodson-Todman Productions in the 1970s and 1980s.

The daytime show was unaffected, and host Gene Rayburn's career was completely unscathed. After Tic-Tac-Dough, Rayburn went to Goodson-Todman, where on December 31, 1962, he began the first of his hosting assignments of The Match Game.

CBS/Syndication: 1978–86

Almost two decades after its original cancellation, the game was reborn as The New Tic-Tac-Dough on CBS gave it a place on its daytime schedule. The series ran from July 3 to September 1, 1978, at 10:00a.m. Eastern/9:00a.m. Central, replacing the Bill Cullen-hosted Pass the Buck. Coincidentally, that timeslot had been occupied from September 1972 to June 1975 by the original version of Barry's The Joker's Wild.

However, the CBS TTD ran only nine weeks because of the high popularity of its competition on NBC, Card Sharks. It was replaced by daytime repeats of All in the Family, which had already been running on CBS daytime for about two a half years. When it was cancelled by CBS, TTD had averaged a 3.9 rating/21 share through July 28, and had a clearance rate of 84%. TTD was one of numerous failed attempts by CBS to find a suitable lead-in to The Price is Right, by then a daytime institution; it was not until The New $25,000 Pyramid and Press Your Luck arrived in 1982 and 1983, respectively, that the network finally succeeded.

On September 18, a previously-planned nighttime version premiered in first-run syndication, where it aired in some markets as a companion series to Joker, which went into an off-network version the previous season. This was a nearly identical situation to a 1976 game packaged by Barry and Enright, Break the Bank, which was hurriedly put into syndication after ABC cancelled it just three months into a daytime run in order to expand two of the network's daytime serials; the syndicated version ran during the 1976–77 season.

Wink Martindale hosted Tic-Tac-Dough for its first seven seasons, then left on May 24, 1985, to host his new creation Headline Chasers. Jim Caldwell took over as host on September 23, 1985, and hosted until the series finale on May 23, 1986. Jay Stewart served as announcer for the first three years. Charlie O'Donnell replaced Stewart in 1981. Occasional substitutes for those announcers included Johnny Gilbert (including the syndicated premiere), Bob Hilton, Mike Darow, John Harlan, and Art James.

In an interview, Martindale stated that while the CBS version began airing Barry & Enright Productions secured a spot to air a syndicated version that began in the fall. The CBS version ended due to poor ratings, but the syndicated version drew high numbers and as a result had an eight-year run.

Throughout its eight-year run, the show used its theme song entitled "Crazy Fun", which was composed by Hal Hidey. From 1978 to the end of 1980, the show was recorded at CBS Television City in Hollywood in studio 31 and studio 43 at different times.
From 1981 to 1984 and again for the final season from 1985 to 1986, the show was taped at the studios of KCOP (also known as Chris Craft Studios). The 1984–85 season was taped at The Production Group Studios, while Chris Craft Studios was getting an overhaul.

Beginning around early 1979, every Friday was "Hat Day", where Martindale received hats from viewers to show off at the end of the show. Some were winter hats, and some even dealt with the show (such as having a picture of a dragon on them). He also wore hats on the Friday shows of Las Vegas Gambit, which he was also hosting on NBC at the time, requiring Martindale to commute between Los Angeles and Las Vegas for over a year.

The gameboard, designed by Bob Bishop of Apple Computer, Inc., was driven by nine Apple II computers, each one responsible for displaying a single box of the gameboard, and in turn controlled by an Altair 8800 system. It was one of the first uses of computer graphics on a television game show.

Syndication: 1990

The second syndicated revival of the series premiered on September 10, 1990. Its theme music was composed by Henry Mancini, his final television theme song. 
The series was a Barry & Enright Production (the company's last) and distributed by ITC Entertainment.

As noted above, Patrick Wayne hosted, while Larry Van Nuys announced with Art James substituting for two weeks. The 1990 revival was one of four game shows to premiere on September 10, 1990, with five premiering altogether for the season. Like the other four series, however, Tic-Tac-Dough did not find an audience. The series was the first of the five to be cancelled, airing its final new episode on December 7, 1990, after thirteen weeks. Three months of reruns followed and the show aired for the last time on March 8, 1991.

International versions
Tic-Tac-Dough is one of only three Barry–Enright game shows known to have foreign adaptations, the others being Twenty One and Concentration.

References

External links
 
 
 
 
 The American Experience: Quiz Show Scandal
 Joseph Stone, Prime Time and Misdemeanors
 "The Big Fix", Time, 19 October 1959

NBC original programming
CBS original programming
First-run syndicated television programs in the United States
1950s American game shows
1956 American television series debuts
1959 American television series endings
1970s American game shows
1980s American game shows
1978 American television series debuts
1986 American television series endings
1990s American game shows
1990 American television series debuts
1990 American television series endings
Television series by Barry & Enright Productions
American television series revived after cancellation
Black-and-white American television shows
Television shows based on tic-tac-toe
English-language television shows
1960s Australian game shows